The Asia/Oceania Zone was one of the three zones of the regional Davis Cup competition in 1994.

In the Asia/Oceania Zone there were three different tiers, called groups, in which teams competed against each other to advance to the upper tier. Winners in Group I advanced to the World Group Qualifying Round, along with losing teams from the World Group first round. The winner of the preliminary round joined the remaining teams in the main draw first round, while the losing team was relegated to the Asia/Oceania Zone Group II in 1995.

Participating nations

Draw

  relegated to Group II in 1995.

  and  advance to World Group Qualifying Round.

Preliminary round

China vs. Japan

First round

Japan vs. Philippines

Hong Kong vs. Indonesia

Second round

New Zealand vs. Japan

Indonesia vs. South Korea

References

External links
Davis Cup official website

Davis Cup Asia/Oceania Zone
Asia Oceania Zone Group I